Decoy (also titled Policewoman Decoy) is an American crime drama television series created for syndication and initially broadcast from October 14, 1957, to July 7, 1958, with 39  black-and-white 30-minute episodes. The series was groundbreaking, as the first American police series with a female protagonist. Many Decoy episodes are in the public domain.

Synopsis
The series starred Beverly Garland as Patricia "Casey" Jones, a female police officer in New York City. The undercover nature of Jones's work had her appearing as women in a variety of roles, including gun molls, hookers, nurses, and singers. Jones had no partner in her police work, and episodes revealed little about her personal life, with occasional exceptions of references to a love affair with a police officer who died on duty.

Popularity 
Decoy was ranked among the top-10 syndicated programs, not only during its initial release, but also "long after production closed down".

Production
Stuart Rosenberg and Don Medford were directors of Decoy, and Steve Gardner was a writer. The show was filmed by Pyramid Productions, partially on location in New York City. Locations included Greenwich Village, the Lower East Side, Randalls Island, and the South Bronx. Studio scenes were filmed in the former Biograph Studios in the Bronx.

Production of the show's pilot began on March 28, 1957, taking seven days for completion. In August 1957, trade publication Billboard reported, "the first-run series is off to one of the fastest sales starts in years, particularly with major station purchases." That sales success included a $600,000 prerelease order from five Westinghouse-owned TV stations and four independent stations.

Production of the series ended on May 29, 1958, because producers lacked the funds to continue. Reruns were broadcast for seven years using the title Police Woman.

Guest stars

 Mason Adams
 Edward Asner
 Martin Balsam
 Barbara Barrie
 Frank Campanella
 Joseph Campanella
 Lonny Chapman
 Albert Dekker
 Peter Falk
 Colleen Dewhurst
 Betty Garde
 Vincent Gardenia
 Bruce Gordon
 Larry Hagman
 Don Hastings
 William Hickey
 Betty Lou Holland
 Arch Johnson
 Diane Ladd
 Zohra Lampert
 Al Lewis
 Joanne Linville
 Ruth McDevitt
 Kay Medford
 Lois Nettleton
 Phyllis Newman
 Simon Oakland
 Tom Pedi
 Leo Penn
 Suzanne Pleshette
 Joanna Roos
 Norman Rose
 Stefan Schnabel
 Frank Silvera
 Frank Sutton
 Michael Tolan
 Betty Walker

Episodes

DVD releases
In 2017, Film Chest Media Group released a DVD set containing all 39 episodes.

References

External links

 
 Decoy TV Episodes posted in the Internet Archive's Classic TV collection.

First-run syndicated television programs in the United States
1957 American television series debuts
1958 American television series endings
Black-and-white American television shows
1950s American crime drama television series
English-language television shows
Television shows set in New York City
Works about police officers